The pink hermit crab (Paguristes gamianus) is a species of hermit crab in the family Diogenidae.

Description
The pink hermit crab is a small hairy-legged pink hermit that grows to 2 cm. It has black eyes and equal-sized pincers with brown tips. It has white tips to its second and third legs.

Distribution
This crab is found only around the southern African coast from southern Namibia to Cape Agulhas in less than 12m of water.

Ecology
The female of this species broods 12-15 eggs within the shell.

References

Hermit crabs
Crustaceans described in 1836